Tchessa Abi is a Togolese barrister. He was the Togolese Minister of Justice from 2005 to 2009. Prior to his appointment as Minister, he was the leader of the Party of Social Reformers in Togo.

References 

Togolese judges